Rhodamine 123  is a chemical compound and a dye. It is often used as a tracer dye within water to determine the rate and direction of flow and transport.  Rhodamine dyes fluoresce and can thus be detected easily and inexpensively with instruments called fluorometers. Rhodamine dyes are used extensively in biotechnology applications such as fluorescence microscopy, flow cytometry, fluorescence correlation spectroscopy and ELISA.  Rhodamine fluorescence can also be used as a measure of membrane polarization in live cell assays both within mitochondria and with bacteria.  This use relies on the fact that rhodamine 123 accumulates in membranes in a manner which is dependent on membrane polarization.

The absorption of rhodamine 123 peaks around 505 nm and luminescence is tunable around 560 nm when used as a laser dye. Its luminescence quantum yield is 0.90.

References

See also
Dye laser
Laser dyes
Rhodamine
Rhodamine B
Rhodamine 6G

Staining dyes
Laser gain media
Xanthenes